John McCauley (1945 – June 3, 1989) was a Canadian ice hockey official who worked as a National Hockey League (NHL) referee from 1966 to 1981.

Early life 
McCauley was raised in Brampton, where he was a hockey goaltender and lacrosse player. In 1959, he won a Canadian Junior Lacrosse championship as a member of the Brampton Excelsiors.

Career 
During his career, McCauley officiated 442 regular season games and 12 playoff games. In 1979, McCauley was assaulted by a fan after a match between the NHL All-Stars and the Soviet Union and sustained a serious injury to his right eye. Although he returned to refereeing, McCauley's depth perception was never the same and he retired from refereeing two years later.

After being appointed assistant director of officiating in June 1979, McCauley worked as the director of officiating from 1986 until his death in 1989.

Personal life 
McCauley died at age 44 after complications from an emergency gall bladder surgery. McCauley's son, Wes McCauley, was drafted in the eighth round by the Detroit Red Wings in the 1990 NHL Entry Draft. Wes eventually followed in his father's footsteps and is currently an NHL referee, having refereed his first NHL match in 2003 and being promoted to full-time status in 2005.

References

1945 births
1989 deaths
National Hockey League officials
Place of birth missing
sl:John McCauley

Ice hockey people from Ontario
People from Brampton